Laoseng (also known as ) is a Loloish language of northern Laos. David Bradley (2007) lists law21 sɛŋ21 as the autonym.

Kingsada (1999) documents  of Chaho village, Bun Tay District, Phongsaly Province, while Kato (2008) documents  of Namnat village, Nyot U District, Phongsaly Province.

References

Kingsadā, Thō̜ngphet, and Tadahiko Shintani. 1999 Basic Vocabularies of the Languages Spoken in Phongxaly, Lao P.D.R. Tokyo: Institute for the Study of Languages and Cultures of Asia and Africa (ILCAA).
Kato, Takashi. 2008. Linguistic Survey of Tibeto-Burman languages in Lao P.D.R. Tokyo: Institute for the Study of Languages and Cultures of Asia and Africa (ILCAA).
Wright, Pamela Sue. n.d. Singsali (Phunoi) Speech Varieties Of Phongsali Province. m.s.

Southern Loloish languages
Languages of Laos